Dixeia dixeyi is a butterfly in the family Pieridae. It is found in western Tanzania, Uganda, the Democratic Republic of the Congo, southern Sudan and south-western Ethiopia. The habitat consists of forests and heavy woodland.

References

Butterflies described in 1904
Pierini